Churchill GAA is a Gaelic Athletic Association club based near Spa outside Tralee in County Kerry, Ireland.  They play in Division 1 of the county league and in the Kerry Junior Football Championship.  All-Ireland medal winner Pat McCarthy previously played for the club. Churchill fields both women's and men's teams.

Honours
 Kerry Novice Football Championship (2): 1972, 2009
 Munster Junior B Football Champions (1): 2009
 St. Brendan's District Senior Football Championship (1): 1985

Notable players
 Martin Ferris
 Pat McCarthy

All-Ireland winners

All-Ireland Senior Football Championship

 Pat McCarthy (1): 1975

All-Ireland Junior Football Championship

 Michael Brennan (2): 2012, 2015
 Ivan Parker (1): 2017
 Conor Daly (1): 2006
 Daniel Doyle (1): 2006

All-Ireland Under 21 Football Championship

 Martin Ferris (1): 1973
 Batt O'Shea (1): 1973

All-Ireland Minor Football Championship

 Ivan Parker (1): 2014

References

External links
Official Churchill GAA website

Gaelic football clubs in County Kerry
Gaelic games clubs in County Kerry